Noirhouse is an Australian dark comedy indie web series, starring Melanie Irons, Nathan Spencer and Mick Davies. It plays on film-noir archetypes, featuring three main characters - a shady detective, femme fatale and Russian mobster. It premiered in September 2013 with an early screening at the Peacock Threater in Hobart, before beginning broadcast on its own website for a 3 episode first series. It was picked up by the Australian Broadcasting Corporation for a six episode second season to be released on its iView broadcasting platform, to begin running in November 2014. It was originally funded by Screen Tasmania and Screen Australia.

Awards

References

2013 web series debuts
Australian comedy web series